This is a list of National Football League quarterbacks who have led the regular season in passing yards each year. The record for passing yards in a season is held by Peyton Manning of the Denver Broncos who threw for 5,477 in 2013. Drew Brees has led the NFL in passing yards in seven seasons, more than any other quarterback in NFL history.  Brees also has five 5,000 yard passing seasons. In the first 55 years of the Super Bowl era (1967-2022), no quarterback who had led the NFL in passing yards led their team to a Super Bowl title. With his victory in Super Bowl LVII in 2023, Patrick Mahomes became the first passing leader to lead a team to a league championship since George Blanda in the 1961 season of the American Football League.

Passing yards leaders

Top 25 single-season passing yards leaders

The NFL requires players to reach certain minimums to qualify as a leader in per-game stats, percentage stats, and passer rating. Since 1978 the minimum number is 14 pass attempts per team game (238 per season, or 224 prior to 2021). This is the yardage leaders list as compiled by Pro football reference.

Other leagues

All-America Football Conference (AAFC)

American Football League (AFL)

Most titles

See also
List of National Football League season passing touchdowns leaders
List of National Football League season pass completion percentage leaders
List of National Football League season passer rating leaders
List of National Football League career passing yards leaders

References

Pro-Football-Reference.com

Passing yards leaders
National Football League lists